Strongyle (Greek:  Stroŋgýlē) may refer to:

Strongyle (worm), or Strongylidae, a family of nematode worms
Santorini, once known as Strongýlē, a Greek island in the Aegian Sea
Stromboli, known to Ancient Greeks as Strongýlē, an Italian island in the Tyrrhenian Sea
Strongyli Megistis, a Greek islet in the eastern Mediterranean Sea